Branislava Peruničić-Draženović is an Emeritus Professor of Control Engineering at the University of Sarajevo. She was elected to the Academy of Sciences and Arts of Bosnia and Herzegovina in 1986.

Early life and education 
Peruničić studied engineering at the University of Belgrade. She earned her bachelor's degree in 1960 and her master's degree in 1966. During this time she worked as an instructor in the Department of Electrical Engineering. She moved to the University of Sarajevo for her doctoral studies, which she completed in 1971. During her studies she worked at the Institute of Control Problems in Moscow. She was immediately appointed as an Assistant Professor.

Research and career 
Alongside her studies Peruničić worked as a Project Leader at Energoinvest until 1970. She was promoted to Professor at the University of Sarajevo in 1976. She was Fulbright visiting scholar in 1981. She held visiting positions at the University of Illinois at Urbana–Champaign and Texas A&M University. Her research has considered both variable structure control and sliding mode control. In 1993 Peruničić joined Lamar University, where she worked as a Professor in the College of Engineering.

In 2009 she was elected Vice President of the Academy of Sciences and Arts of Bosnia and Herzegovina. She serves on the University of Sarajevo Council for Science and Arts.

Selected publications 
Her publications include;

References 

Living people
Control engineering
University of Belgrade alumni
Academic staff of the University of Sarajevo
University of Sarajevo alumni
Lamar University people
Serbian women scientists
Serbian women engineers
1936 births